Cema Nasau (born 15 November 1999) is a Fijian footballer who plays as a midfielder for Ba FC and the Fiji women's national team.

Nasau is from Koroqaqa in Ba Province and plays for Ba F.C. She started playing football in 2015. In 2016 she was part of the Fiji women's national under-17 football team for the 2017 OFC U-16 Women's Championship. In 2017 she was part of the Fiji women's national under-20 football team for the 2017 OFC U-19 Women's Championship. In 2018 she was selected for the Fiji women's national football team for the 2018 OFC Women's Nations Cup. In 2019 she was part of the team which won bronze at the 2019 Pacific Games in Apia.

In 2022 she won the golden boot and golden ball awards in the Women’s Inter-District Championship. During the 2022 OFC Women's Nations Cup she won two player of the match awards, as well as best player of the tournament.

In 2023 she will move to the Babasiga Lionesses.

References

1999 births
Living people
Fijian women's footballers
Women's association football midfielders
Fiji women's international footballers